Eriogonum panamintense is a species of wild buckwheat known by the common name Panamint Mountain buckwheat. It is native to several of the desert mountain ranges of eastern California and western Nevada, including the Panamint Range. It grows in various types of mountain ridge habitat, such as sagebrush and coniferous woodland.

Description
This is a perennial herb producing small clumps of erect stems up to about 40 centimeters. The woolly, oval leaves are located around the base of the stems. The inflorescence is a spreading array of branches lined with clusters of white to off-white to brownish flowers, each of which is no more than half a centimeter long.

References

External links
Calflora Database: Eriogonum panamintense (Panamint mountain buckwheat)
Jepson eFlora treatment of Eriogonum panamintense
UC ClalPhotos gallery of Eriogonum panamintense (Panamint mountain buckwheat)

panamintense
Flora of the California desert regions
Flora of Nevada
Flora of the Great Basin
Natural history of the Mojave Desert
Death Valley National Park
Panamint Range
Endemic flora of the United States
Plants described in 1935